The Demon In The Sun Parlor is a novel by the American writer Lester Goran set in the late 1930s in the vicinity of Crandon Park in Miami, Florida.

It tells the story of the family of Captain Joseph Ludwig, formerly the youngest captain in the U.S. Army. According to the dust jacket copy, Ludwig's youngest son, Eric, "a child with definite artistic gifts and unmistakable symptoms of insanity, opens up a dark, murderous landscape so desperate and threatening no one can place a name on its inchoate terror".

References

1968 American novels
American horror novels
Novels set in Miami
Novels by Lester Goran
American historical novels
Novels set in the 1930s
New American Library books